Papradno is a village and municipality in Považská Bystrica District in the Trenčín Region of north-western Slovakia.

History
In historical records, the village was first mentioned in 1525. In the past it belonged to the feudal dominion Bytča.  Until 1918, the district was part of the Hungarian county of Trenčín.

Geography
The municipality lies at an altitude of 398 metres and covers an area of 55.816 km². It has a population of about 2540 people.

References

External links

 
http://www.statistics.sk/mosmis/eng/run.html

Villages and municipalities in Považská Bystrica District